Grenada competed at the 2011 World Championships in Athletics from August 27 to September 4 in Daegu, South Korea.

Team selection

A team of 3 athletes was
announced to represent the country
in the event.  The team is led by rising 400m sprint star Kirani James.

Medalists
The following competitors from Grenada won medals at the Championships

Results

Men
Kirani James became the third youngest ever male gold medallist at a World Championships and also the first man from Grenada to climb the podium at this global event.

Women

References

External links
Official local organising committee website
Official IAAF competition website

Nations at the 2011 World Championships in Athletics
World Championships in Athletics
Grenada at the World Championships in Athletics